United Kingdom House at 164–182 Oxford Street in the City of Westminster, London, is a grade II listed former Waring and Gillow's department store designed in 1905–1906 by Frank Atkinson with advice from Richard Norman Shaw. It is now used as retail and offices premises.

References

External links 
 
 

Grade II listed buildings in the City of Westminster
Department store buildings in the United Kingdom
Grade II listed retail buildings
Oxford Street
Buildings and structures completed in 1906
1906 establishments in the United Kingdom